Scott Stapp (born Anthony Scott Flippen, August 8, 1973) is an American singer, best known as the lead vocalist and lyricist of the rock band Creed. He has also fronted the band Art of Anarchy and has released three solo albums: The Great Divide (2005), Proof of Life (2013), and The Space Between the Shadows (2019). He has a baritone voice and has been compared to Pearl Jam's Eddie Vedder

Stapp has received several accolades, including numerous RIAA certifications. Stapp and Creed bandmate Mark Tremonti won a Grammy Award for Best Rock Song in 2001 as the writers of the Creed song "With Arms Wide Open". In 2006, Hit Parader ranked Stapp as the 68th-greatest heavy metal vocalist.

Career

Creed: 1994–2004; 2009–2012

Stapp was a founding member and the original lead vocalist of American rock band Creed. After meeting his future bandmate Mark Tremonti at Lake Highland Preparatory School in Orlando, Stapp reunited with Tremonti while both attended Florida State University. The two quickly developed a friendship based on their mutual passion for music. Stapp formed Creed with Tremonti in 1994, with fellow members Brian Marshall and Scott Phillips joining as bassist and drummer, respectively.

The band released its debut album My Own Prison in 1997 to mainstream success, selling over six million copies. Four singles were released from the album: "My Own Prison", "Torn", "What's This Life For", and "One". All four singles reached the Top Three on Billboard's Hot Mainstream Rock Tracks chart. The album was followed in 1999 by Human Clay, which was an immediate success and certified diamond and eleven times platinum by the RIAA.

The band released another multi-platinum selling album, Weathered, in 2001. The tour to support this record was overwhelmingly successful but ended with a controversial concert in Chicago. This concert ultimately led to the band's breakup.

In 2004, Creed announced that it had disbanded, citing tension between Stapp and the other members. Creed released its Greatest Hits album in November 2004.

In 2009, it was announced that Creed had reunited. The band's fourth record, Full Circle, was released in October 2009. Creed supported the album by touring throughout North and South America, Canada, Europe, and Australia during the summers of 2009 and 2010.

In March 2012, Stapp reconvened with his Creed bandmates to rehearse for their "2 Nights" tour, during which the band performed its first two albums, My Own Prison and Human Clay, back to back in their entirety. It was announced that Stapp and Mark Tremonti would enter the studio to start recording new songs in June, but no progress was made. In October 2013, Stapp noted in an interview that extensive work was done on the new album throughout 2011 and 2012. However, the project was suddenly abandoned, and Stapp stated he was unaware of the reason. Stapp also hinted that the relationship between himself and Tremonti had once again broken down, leaving the future of the band uncertain. Mark Tremonti said that his relationship with Scott Stapp went south during the reunion tour when Scott indicated that he thought Mark would end Alter Bridge to focus solely on Creed, which Mark was not willing to do under any circumstance. In 2014, Stapp maintained that the band was still together (if inactive).

Solo career and contributions: 2004–present
After Creed announced its breakup in 2004, Stapp recorded the song "Relearn Love" with 7 Aurelius and The Tea Party for the album The Passion of the Christ: Songs, a collection of tracks inspired by the 2004 Mel Gibson film The Passion of the Christ. He then began working on his debut solo album. Titled The Great Divide, the record was released in the U.S. on November 22, 2005, peaking at No. 19 on the Billboard 200. "The Great Divide", "Justify", and "Surround Me" were released as singles. The album was certified platinum on December 14, 2005. The Great Divide has since reached double platinum.

Stapp was ranked as the 68th greatest heavy metal vocalist of all time by Hit Parader in 2006.

On August 18, 2010, Stapp wrote: "I'm stripping down all the Creed hits, as well as my solo material, in a manner fans have never heard before but have long been screaming for." Creed's touring rhythm guitarist Eric Friedman joined Stapp on the acoustic tour. The short solo acoustic tour began September 28, 2010, and concluded November 20, 2010.

In the spring of 2010, Stapp recorded an anthem for the National League baseball team the Florida Marlins entitled "Marlins Will Soar". The song was a rewrite of Stapp's song "You Will Soar," using different lyrics and a slightly different melody in the verses. According to The Huffington Post, "Marlins Will Soar" was met with extremely negative reviews.

Stapp appeared on Carlos Santana's solo album Guitar Heaven: The Greatest Guitar Classics of All Time, a cover album on which Stapp sings on the cover of the Creedence Clearwater Revival song "Fortunate Son". The album was released on September 21, 2010.

Stapp confirmed in 2010 that his next solo album would be devoted to the topics of lust and love. Eleven tracks from the album were recorded in late 2010. The album was later shelved indefinitely. A song from this unreleased album, "A Prayer for Sunrise", was released in 2012 to promote Stapp's autobiography.

In 2013, Stapp released his second solo album, Proof of Life. On October 8, 2013, the song "Slow Suicide" went to radio.

On March 22, 2019, Stapp released the single "Purpose for Pain". His album The Space Between the Shadows was released on July 19, 2019. Stapp began touring in support of the album in June 2019.  In mid-2019, Stapp planned to tour the United States with American rock band Messer.

In 2021, Stapp collaborated with electronic dance music artists Wooli and Trivecta on their song "Light Up The Sky", which was released on Ophelia Records.

Art of Anarchy: 2016–2018 
On May 3, 2016, Scott Stapp announced that he would replace Scott Weiland (who died on December 3, 2015) as the lead singer of Art of Anarchy. "The Madness", the band's first single with Stapp as lead singer, was released in August 2016. The band released its second album (and first with Stapp), also called The Madness, on March 24, 2017. The album has received critical accolades. The album also received a 10/10 rating from Amps and Green Screens.

In February 2018, it was reported that Stapp was being sued by Art of Anarchy for allegedly refusing to promote The Madness or tour in support of the album, having breached contractual obligations in the process.

Acting
In December 2020, it was announced that Stapp would portray Frank Sinatra in a 2023 biopic film based on the life of U.S. President Ronald Reagan.

Philanthropy
In 2000, Stapp founded the With Arms Wide Open Foundation, a nonprofit organization "dedicated to helping underprivileged children and families around the world." The foundation has donated over $1 million to various causes.

In early 2012, to promote fundraising for victims of the 2011 Tōhoku earthquake and tsunami, Stapp and his wife, in cooperation with the U.S. Embassy in Tokyo, IsraAid, the U.S. Armed Forces, and the United Service Organizations, traveled to Japan and visited with victims of the tsunami in affected towns including Sendai and Ishinomaki along Japan's northeast coastline. Stapp also performed an acoustic show on board the USS George Washington at the Yokosuka Naval Base for U.S. troops stationed in Japan to thank and express his appreciation for them.

Personal life
Stapp was born Anthony Scott Flippen on August 8, 1973, in Orlando, Florida. He was raised by his mother, Lynda, and his stepfather, Steven Stapp, a dentist, whose surname he took. Bands that influenced him to pursue a music career included Def Leppard and U2. His first show that he ever performed in was when he was nine years old and he performed "Yesterday" by The Beatles at Bear Lake Elementary School in the auditorium. He graduated from Lake Highland Preparatory School.

Stapp is a Christian. "I would feel a connection with God when I wrote the words and then when I would sing the songs, learning the songs, I would feel the Holy Spirit," confirmed Stapp in a 2013 interview. He wrote a memoir, Sinner's Creed, which was released by Tyndale House on October 2, 2012. He has Native American ancestry. He has a baritone voice.

Family
In 1997, Stapp married Hillaree Burns. They were married for sixteen months and divorced in 1998. Stapp has a son, Jagger, with Burns. After the couple's divorce, Stapp retained full custody of Jagger.

On February 11, 2006, Stapp married Miss New York USA 2004 winner and model Jaclyn Nesheiwat. Together they have a daughter and a son. In November 2014, Jaclyn filed for divorce. The couple eventually sought help and continued together. The couple had their third child, a son, in November 2017.

Legal and personal troubles
In July 2002, Stapp was detained by Florida police and charged with reckless driving after he drove his SUV off the road before swerving back into the proper lane. He was released from custody after posting $500 bail.

In 2003, Stapp contemplated suicide after drinking a bottle of Jack Daniel's whiskey. He retrieved two MP5s from his collection and put the guns to his head, but did not pull the triggers after looking at a picture of his son, Jagger. He later said he had been convinced that anyone involved with Creed wanted him dead so he would become a "Kurt Cobain martyr-type" and increase record sales. Says Scott, "I had crazy thoughts going through my head." He later said that instead of killing himself, he fired a few rounds in his home. He said, "I was in the throes of prednisone coming out of my body [...] I shot a few rounds off and instantly was like, 'What the hell am I doing?' So I put the guns away and ran out to the garage and got the putty and patched the holes."

On Thanksgiving night of 2005, Stapp was involved in a fight with members of the band 311 at the Harbor Court Hotel in Baltimore. Members of 311 have said Stapp started the fight. After five minutes, hotel security broke up the fight and removed Stapp from the hotel. Stapp claimed that he did not instigate the altercation.

Stapp was arrested on February 12, 2006 (one day after his second wedding), for suspected intoxication.

In March 2006, Stapp filed a lawsuit to block the release of a sex video involving himself, Kid Rock, and four women. The suit was settled in 2007, with the defendant agreeing to pay Stapp an undisclosed sum and to refrain from distributing the video.

Stapp has said he attempted suicide in Miami in 2006. According to Stapp, he jumped over a balcony and fell 40 feet, fracturing his skull and breaking his hip and nose. He credited rapper T.I. with saving his life, stating, "I laid out there for two and a half hours and my guardian angel showed up. He immediately took care of the situation and saved my life."

In a 2006 Rolling Stone interview, Stapp acknowledged that he had become addicted to Percocet, Xanax and prednisone during Creed's tour in support of Weathered.

On May 20, 2007, Stapp was charged with one count of felony assault stemming from a domestic violence incident. Stapp was later set free on supervised release. Stapp apologized to his wife and the public on May 23, 2007, and the charge was later dropped.

In 2015, Stapp told People he had been diagnosed with bipolar disorder following a psychotic break. He commented that the diagnosis was "a big sign  of relief, because finally, we had an answer" about the reasons for his mental health difficulties. In the same interview, Stapp indicated that he was sober and working through a 12-step program.

Solo discography

Studio albums

Live albums

Singles

Music videos

Tours

 Creed Tours 1994–2001
 The Great Divide Tour (2006–2007)
 2010 Unplugged Tour 
 2011–2012 Tours 
 Proof of Life Tour 2014 
 Proof of Life Tour 2016
 Make America Rock Again Tour (headlining) (2017) 
 Live & Unplugged Tour (2017) 
 Summer Tour 2018 
 The Space Between the Shadows Tour (2019)

Notes
A^ Stapp partnered with DiscLive to release a set of individually numbered live recordings, one for each of his 2017 Live and Unplugged tour dates.

References

External links

 

 

1973 births
American heavy metal singers
Creed (band) members
Florida State University alumni
Grammy Award winners
Living people
People with bipolar disorder
Singers from Orlando, Florida
American baritones
American Christians
20th-century American singers
21st-century American singers
Art of Anarchy members
20th-century American male singers
21st-century American male singers
Lake Highland Preparatory School alumni